Hans Hollein (30 March 1934 – 24 April 2014) was an Austrian architect and designer and key figure of postmodern architecture. Some of his most notable works are the Haas House and the Albertina extension in the inner city of Vienna.

Biography
Hollein was born in Vienna, and graduated in 1956 from the Academy of Fine Arts Vienna, where he studied in the master class of Clemens Holzmeister. During 1959 he attended the Illinois Institute of Technology and then in 1960, the University of California, Berkeley, where he completed his Master of Architecture degree. During these years he met Mies van der Rohe, Frank Lloyd Wright and Richard Neutra. In 1963 he exhibited, Architecture, along with Walter Pichler at Galerie nächst St. Stephan in St Stephen Vienna, highlighting their ideas for utopian architecture. Afterwards, he worked for various architectural firms in Sweden and the United States before returning to Vienna, founding his own office in 1964.

Hollein's early works were small scale designs, such as the Retti candle shop in Vienna, which notably featured a facade constructed of anodized aluminum.

In 1972, Hollein designed a series of glasses for the American Optical Corps.

Hollein was a guest professor at Washington University in St. Louis on two separate occasions, the first being 1963–64 and the second in 1966. During this period he was also a visiting professor at the Yale School of Architecture. He was a professor at the Kunstakademie Düsseldorf between 1967 and 1976, after which he became a professor at the University of Applied Arts Vienna.

Hollein worked mainly as an architect but also established himself as a designer through his work for the Memphis Group and the Alessi Company. Additionally, he staged various exhibitions, including for the Venice Biennale. In 1980 he designed the stage for a production of Arthur Schnitzler's drama Komödie der Verführung (Comedy of Seduction) at Vienna's Burgtheater. In 1985 Hollein was awarded the Pritzker Prize.

Hollein achieved international fame with his winning competition designs for the Abteiberg Museum in Mönchengladbach (1972–82) and an underground Guggenheim Museum branch in Salzburg (1989). The later hasn't been built, but his ideas for an underground museum still materialised in the Vulcania European Centre of Vulcanology in Auvergne in France (1997–2002).

Starting from the late 1990s, Hollein designed large-scale projects, including bank headquarters in Lichtenstein, Spain and Peru. Starting from 2010 he worked with Ulf Kotz and Christoph Monschein at the Hans Hollein & Partner ZT GmbH.

Hollein died on 24 April 2014 in Vienna, after a long illness, at the age of 80. 

His son Max Hollein is the Director of the Metropolitan Museum of Art in New York City. Previously he was Director and CEO of the Fine Arts Museums of San Francisco, the umbrella organization of the de Young Museum and Legion of Honor Museum. He is the former Director of the Städel Museum, the Liebieghaus and the Schirn Kunsthalle in Frankfurt am Main, Germany.

Main works

1964–65 : Retti candle shop, Vienna, Austria 
1967–69 : Feigen Gallery, New York
1972–74 : Schullin Jewellery shop, Vienna
1972–82 : Abteiberg Museum Mönchengladbach
1977–78 : Glass and Ceramics house, Teheran, Iran
1979–90 : Ganztagsschule, Vienna
1983–85 : Rauchstrasse apartments in Berlin, part of the International Building Exhibition
1985–90 : Haas-Haus in Vienna
1987–91 : Museum für Moderne Kunst in Frankfurt am Main
1989 : Guggenheim ('Museum im Mönchsberg'), Salzburg, Austria (unbuilt)
1992–2002 : Niederösterreichisches Landesmuseum, St. Pölten, Austria
1994–2000 : Generali Media Tower Donaukanal, Vienna
1996–2001 : Austrian Embassy in Berlin 
1996–2000 : Interbank Headquarters, Lima, Peru
1997–2002 : Centrum Bank in Vaduz, Liechtenstein, in collaboration with Bargetze+Partner
1997–2002 : Vulcania – European Centre of Vulcanology in Auvergne, France
2001–03 : Albertina Museum extension, Vienna
2004–08 : Hilton hotel, Vienna
2004–07 : Sea Mio, Apartment-Towers, Taipei, Taiwan
2006–11 : Pezet 515, Lima

Prizes
R. S. Reynolds Memorial Award endowed by the American Institute of Architects (1966 and 1984)
Prize for Architecture of the City of Vienna, (1974)
Grand Austrian State Prize for Architecture (1983)
Pritzker Architecture Prize (1985)
Austrian Decoration for Science and Art (1990)
Gold Decoration for Services to Vienna (1994)
Grand Merit Cross of the Order of Merit of the Federal Republic of Germany (1997)
Officer of the Legion of Honour (France, 2003)
Honorary Medal of the Austrian capital Vienna in Gold (2004)
Grand Decoration of Honour in Gold for Services to the Republic of Austria (2009)
Golden Rathausmann (2009)

References

External links

 
 Pritzker Prize gallery

1934 births
2014 deaths
Architects from Vienna
Illinois Institute of Technology alumni
Members of the European Academy of Sciences and Arts
Postmodern architects
Academy of Fine Arts Vienna alumni
Academic staff of Kunstakademie Düsseldorf
Pritzker Architecture Prize winners
Commanders Crosses of the Order of Merit of the Federal Republic of Germany
Honorary Fellows of the American Institute of Architects
Recipients of the Austrian Decoration for Science and Art
Recipients of the Grand Austrian State Prize
Officiers of the Légion d'honneur
Recipients of the Grand Decoration for Services to the Republic of Austria
UC Berkeley College of Environmental Design alumni